Georg Heinrich Häberlin (1644–1699) was a Lutheran theologian of Germany.

Life 
Georg Heinrich Häberlin was born at Stuttgart on 30 September 1644. He studied at Tübingen, became deacon in 1668, doctor and professor of theology in 1681, member of the consistory and preacher in 1692, and died on 20 August 1699.

Works 

 Specimen Theologicae Practicae;
 Conspectus Locorum Theologicorum;
 Theologia Corinthiaca in Forma Systematis Proposita;
 De Principio Fidei;
 De Unione Fidelium cum Christo;
 De Justificatione Hominis Coram Deo;
 De Satisfactione Christi;
 De Chiliasmo Hodierno; 
 Fidei Christiane Rulina et Infidelitatis Judaicae Firmamento.

References

Sources 

 Pick, B. (1886). "Häberlin, Georg Heinrich". In McClintock, John; Strong, James (eds.). Cyclopædia of Biblical, Theological and Ecclesiastical Literature. Supplement.—Vol. 2. New York: Harper & Brothers. p. 504. 

1644 births
1699 deaths
German Lutheran theologians
17th-century German Lutheran clergy
17th-century German Protestant theologians
17th-century German writers
Academic staff of the University of Tübingen